Nobody Told Me is a studio album by British blues musician John Mayall. It was released on 22 February 2019 through Forty Below Records.

On this album, different musicians play lead guitar on different songs.  These guests include Todd Rundgren, Steven Van Zandt, Alex Lifeson, Joe Bonamassa, Larry McCray and Carolyn Wonderland.

Nobody Told Me was recorded from 23 January to 1 February 2018.  At the time, Mayall was 84 years old.

Critical reception
On AllMusic, Thom Jurek said, "Mayall has a way of both purposing his guitarists and focusing them while getting them to open up.... Guitar slayers notwithstanding, Nobody Told Me is a hallmark Mayall date, chock-full of great songs and performances that underscore his considerable (and well-deserved) reputation."

In Glide Magazine, Steve Ovadia wrote, "Bluesman John Mayall is perhaps best known for his ear for talent....  But Mayall is more than just a great hiring manager. He's also a talented singer and harmonica/keyboard player. Nobody Told Me, his latest album, leaves little doubt that the 85-year-old Englishman still has plenty of blues left in his tank."

In Blues Blast Magazine, John Mitchell wrote, "Those who missed the guitar element of John’s music last time around will love this one. There are several standout performances and Carolyn Wonderland's excellent contributions bode well for the next chapter of John Mayall's amazing career."

In Blues Rock Review, Meghan Roos said, ""Fifty-three years after releasing his first album with the Bluesbreakers, John Mayall is back with his latest studio album Nobody Told Me, a 10-track collection released in late February that sounds as fresh and energetic as any of the albums he's recorded in the last half-century.

Track listing

Personnel
Musicians
 John Mayall – vocals, keyboards, harmonica
 Greg Rzab – bass guitar
 Jay Davenport – drums
 Ron Dziubla – saxophone
 Mark Pender – trumpet
 Richard A Rosenberg – trombone
 Billy Watts – rhythm guitar
Production
 Produced by Eric Corne and John Mayall
 Engineering, mixing: Eric Corne
 Mastering: Mark Chalecki, Eric Corne
 Recording engineers: John Lousteau, Rene Marino
 Design, artwork: John Mayall
 Photography: David Gomez, Christina Arrigoni

Charts

References

2019 albums
John Mayall albums
Albums produced by John Mayall